Gorn is a surname. Notable people with the surname include:

 Lev Gorn (born 1971), Russian–American actor
 Saul Gorn (1912–1992), American computer scientist
 Steve Gorn (born 1987), American flautist and saxophonist
 Walter Gorn (1898–1968), German general in World War II